Mohiuddinpur is a census town in ambedkarnagar district in the Indian state of Uttar Pradesh.

Demographics
 India census, Mohiuddinpur had a population of 4,892. Males constitute 55% of the population and females 45%. Mohiuddinpur has an average literacy rate of 63%, higher than the national average of 59.5%: male literacy is 71%, and female literacy is 52%. In Mohiuddinpur, 14% of the population is under 6 years of age.

References

Cities and towns in Meerut district